Świnoujście railway station is the principal railway station in the town of Świnoujście, in the West Pomeranian Voivodeship, Poland. The station and is located on the Szczecin Dąbie–Świnoujście Port railway. The train services are operated by PKP and Polregio.

Train services
The following trains run from this station:

Intercity: Świnoujście - Szczecin - Krzyz - Poznan - Kutno - Warsaw - Lublin
Intercity: Świnoujście - Szczecin - Krzyz - Poznan - Kutno - Lodz - Krakow
Intercity: Świnoujście - Szczecin - Krzyz - Poznan - Ostrow Wielkopolski - Katowice/Krakow
Intercity: Świnoujście - Szczecin - Krzyz - Poznan - Leszno - Wroclaw - Opole - Katowice - Krakow - Rzeszow - Przemysl
Intercity: Świnoujście - Szczecin - Kostrzyn - Rzepin - Zielona Gora - Wroclaw - Katowice
Intercity: Świnoujście - Szczecin - Kostrzyn - Rzepin - Zielona Gora - Wroclaw - Kedzierzyn-Kozle - Bielsko Biala
Regional (R): Świnoujście - Szczecin - Choszczno - Krzyz - Wronki - Szamotuly - Poznan

Public transport
The coach station is located opposite the train station. The ferry to the main part of Świnoujście is also nearby, this operates every 20 minutes. Local bus services 1, 5, 7 and 10 serve the station.

References

 This article is based upon a translation of the Polish language version as of October 2016.

Railway stations in Poland opened in 1900
Station
Railway stations in West Pomeranian Voivodeship